The Atlantis Conspiracy is a 2001 HBO/ZDF film that was written and directed by Dean Silvers and starring Amanda Donohoe, Jeremy Davies, Bill Sage, and Adrienne Shelly. Filming took place in New York.

Premise
Lauren Marcus (Amanda Donohoe) reluctantly moves back to New York City and is forced to decide whether she wants to reconnect with the life she abruptly left behind. When a mystery stemming from a suicide draws her in, she and two friends, a young bookie and a cynical federal agent, seek to uncover the truth.

Cast
 Amanda Donohoe as Lauren Marcus 
 Jeremy Davies as Flush
 Bill Sage as Jon
 Paul Calderon as Guy 
 Adrienne Shelly as Samantha 
 Danton Stone as Barry
 Peter McRobbie as Mr. Dombrowski
 Glenn Fitzgerald as Patient
 Forrest Silvers as Eco-Ranger
 Tyler Silvers as Eco-Ranger

References

External links
 

2001 television films
2001 films
2001 drama films
American drama television films
2000s English-language films
2000s American films